Earl of Chatham, of Chatham in the County of Kent, was a title in the Peerage of Great Britain. It was created in 1766 for William Pitt the Elder on his appointment as Lord Privy Seal, along with the subsidiary title Viscount Pitt, of Burton Pynsent in the County of Somerset, also in the Peerage of Great Britain.

The first earl's wife, the former Lady Hester Grenville, daughter of the 1st Countess Temple, had earlier been created Baroness Chatham, of Chatham in the County of Kent, also in the Peerage of Great Britain, in 1761, as at that stage her husband had wished to remain a member of the House of Commons.

Their second son was William Pitt the Younger, who became the country's youngest prime minister in 1783, at the age of 24.

Their eldest son, John Pitt, inherited the earldom and viscountcy in 1778 and the barony in 1803. Upon his death in 1835, all three titles became extinct.

Barons Chatham (1761)

The second creation of this title came in 1761 in favour of Lady Hester Pitt; the first creation was for John Campbell, 2nd Duke of Argyll and hence the Duke of Argyll.

Hester Pitt, 1st Baroness Chatham (1720–1803)
John Pitt, 2nd Earl of Chatham, 2nd Baron Chatham (1756–1835)

Earls of Chatham (1766)
William Pitt, 1st Earl of Chatham (1708–1778)
John Pitt, 2nd Earl of Chatham (1756–1835)

See also
Earl of Londonderry (1726 creation)
Baron Camelford

External links

1766 establishments in Great Britain
1835 disestablishments in the United Kingdom
Extinct earldoms in the Peerage of Great Britain
Noble titles created in 1766
Chatham
Chatham